Miha Korošec (born 11 August 1991) is a Slovenian football player who plays for Šampion.

References

External links
NZS profile 

1991 births
Living people
Slovenian footballers
Association football defenders
NK Nafta Lendava players
NK Celje players
Slovenian PrvaLiga players
NK Šampion players
NK Zavrč players
Slovenia youth international footballers